Ravensbrück was a German concentration camp exclusively for women from 1939 to 1945, located in northern Germany,  north of Berlin at a site near the village of Ravensbrück (part of Fürstenberg/Havel). The largest single national group consisted of 40,000 Polish women.  Others included 26,000 Jewish from all countries, 18,800 Russian, 8,000 French, and 1,000 Dutch. More than 80 percent were political prisoners. Many slave labor prisoners were employed by Siemens & Halske. From 1942 to 1945, medical experiments to test the effectiveness of sulfonamides were undertaken.

In the spring of 1941, the SS established a small adjacent camp for male inmates, who built and managed the camp's gas chambers in 1944. Of some 130,000 female prisoners who passed through the Ravensbrück camp, about 50,000 of them perished, some 2,200 were killed in the gas chambers and 15,000 survived until liberation.

Female prisoners
 Vera Albreht, Slovenian poet
 Louise Aslanian, French-Armenian writer, poetess, French Resistance fighter (executed)
 Ágnes Bartha
 Aat Breur-Hibma
 Esther Béjarano
 Maja Berezowska
 Henriette Bie Lorentzen
 Halina Birenbaum
 Betsie ten Boom
 Corrie ten Boom
 Margarete Buber-Neumann
 Neus Català
 Anica Černej, Slovenian poet
 Hortense Clews
 Marie-Louise Cloarec (executed)
 Eugénie Djendi (executed)
 Carmella Flöck, Austrian Resistance
 Geneviève de Gaulle-Anthonioz
 Louisa Gould, Channel Islands resistance movement
 Mirjana Gross, Croatian historian and writer
 Alena Hájková, Czech resistance fighter
 Odette Hallowes
 Emmi Handke
 Katharina Jacob, Teacher and resistance leader
 Elisabeth Jäger resistance activist and journalist
 Milena Jesenská
 Edith Kiss
 Halina Krahelska
 Karolina Lanckorońska
 Sonja Lapajne-Oblak, Slovenian architect, civil engineer and partisan fighter
 Violette Lecoq, French artist
 Lise London
 Pierrette Louin (executed)
 Rosa Manus
 Suzanne Mertzizen (executed)
 Eileen Nearne, a.k.a. Agent Rose (escaped)
 Käthe Niederkirchner
 Andrée Peel, French Resistance
 Wanda Półtawska
 Margarete Rosenberg, lesbian survivor
 Élisabeth de Rothschild
 Zofia Rzewuska
 Marek Rzewuski, born in Ravensbruck 
 Sylvia Salvesen, author
 Maria Skobtsova, (Saint Maria Skobtsova), nun
 Elli Smula (1914–1943), tram conductor and lesbian
 Ceija Stojka
 Violette Szabo
 Ivanka Žnidar Slovenia
 Seren Tuvel Bernstein, author of The Seamstress: A Memoir of Survival
 Rose Van Thyn
 Halszka Wasilewska
 Gabrielle Weidner
 Alice Wosikowski
 Hanna Zemer, Slovak-born Israeli journalist

Male prisoners
 Jurek Becker as child
 Eugen Bolz
 Leopold Engleitner
 August Froehlich
 Juraj Herz
 Julius Leber
 Hjalmar Schacht
 Otto Schniewind
 Karl Seitz
 Fritz Wolffheim
 Roman Gutowski

References

Ravensbrück concentration camp